European theatre (or theater) may refer to:

Military theatres
 European theater of the Seven Years' War
 European theatre of World War I
 European theatre of World War II
 European Theater of Operations, United States Army

Other uses
 Theatre#Early modern and modern theatre in the West